Christina "Steenz" Stewart is an American cartoonist and editor known for illustrating Archival Quality and currently authoring and illustrating the daily comic strip Heart of the City. They were born September 29, 1990, in Detroit, Michigan, and currently reside in St. Louis, Missouri. Upon taking over Heart of the City from Mark Tatulli in May 2020, they became the second nationally syndicated black nonbinary cartoonist, preceded in this distinction by Bianca Xunise only a month prior.

Early life 

Growing up in St. Louis, Steenz was a fan of comics and cartoons that later influenced their work, including Calvin and Hobbes, Cathy, Curtis, Recess, Hey Arnold!, and Doug. They attended Maryville University and studied studio art with a focus on illustration. They left as a junior and worked as a librarian and a comic book shop manager at the Eisner-winning Star Clipper Comics in St. Louis until its closing in 2015. While managing the comic book shop they decided to make comics, but didn't pursue them as a career until being exposed to Brittany Williams' work on a Samurai Jack comic: "The second I saw [Williams'] name on [the comic] … I was like, 'Wait a second; she's a black woman, she's making comics — I can do that too,' and finally it kind of clicked for me too."

Career 
Following Star Clipper's closing in 2015, Steenz went on to work as an editor at Lion Forge Comics, where they worked on the first 12 issues of the comics and tabletop gaming magazine Rolled and Told until 2019.

Steenz contributed the short comic "The Update" along with letterer Melanie Ujimori to editor Taneka Stotts' Eisner- and Ignatz-winning Elements: Fire, and has also appeared in the anthologies Mine! and Dead Beats.

Their first major publication was Archival Quality, which they co-created with writer Ivy Noelle Weir. It was published by Oni Press in 2018.

Steenz took over writing and illustrating Heart of the City for Mark Tatulli. Their first strip syndicated via Andrews McMeel appeared on May 24, 2020.

On May 12, 2020, it was announced that Steenz would be illustrating and co-creating a graphic novel about the history of tabletop RPGs alongside writer Samuel Sattin; the book is estimated for a 2023 release date.

In July 2022, Steenz alleged on social media that Oni Press was not paying creators their royalties. The Beat reported that "Steenz is the artist on the award winning OGN Archival Quality, published by Oni back in 2018. Several Oni creators responded to her tweets with their own complaints". Oni Press did not respond to Bleeding Cool's request for comment.

Selected works 
Archival Quality (2018) – Cel Walden starts a new job as an archivist at the Logan Museum. As she struggles with depression and anxiety, she dreams about a ghostly woman. As she learns more about the ghost who haunts her dreams, she learns more about herself and the other employees of the Logan Museum.

Heart of the City (2020–present) – The comic is about Heart Lamarr, a middle-school student who lives in Philadelphia. Stories focus on Heart's relations with her friends and family, as well as her school life and experiences with popular culture. Steenz took over the strip after original creator Mark Tatulli stepped down.

Recognition and awards 
Elements: Fire, A Comic Anthology by Creators of Color won the 2018 Eisner Award for Best Anthology and the 2017 Ignatz Award for Best Anthology. The anthology contains work by Steenz.

In February 2019, Steenz and Ivy Noelle Weir were named winners of the 5th Annual Dwayne McDuffie Award for Diversity in Comics for Archival Quality. The book was also selected as a Junior Library Guild Gold Standard publication in 2018.

Bibliography
 Mine: A Planned Parenthood Benefit Anthology, ComicMix, 2017
 Archival Quality (with Ivy Noelle Weir), Oni Press, 2018
Rolled & Told issues #1-#12 (Editor), 2018, 2019
Dead Beats, A Wave Blue World Anthology, 2019
Heart of the City, Andrews McMeel Syndication, 2020

Self-published
 Encyclopedia Brown and the Case of the Muscle Maker Fan Comic, Gumroad, 2019
 Receiving Transmissions, Gumroad, 2019

References

External links

 Steenz's official website 
 Steenz's Twitter
 Steenz's Instagram
 Steenz's Gumroad (for self-published work)
 Read Heart of the City online

American comic strip cartoonists
African-American comics creators
American comics creators
Living people
1990 births
21st-century African-American people